Innocence is a 1986 novel by the British author Penelope Fitzgerald.  Set in Italy, it is a comedy of manners concerning the marriage of the young daughter of an old but impoverished aristocratic family, and a young neurologist who has tried to cut himself off from emotion. "Innocence" is the first of a group of four historical novels written by Fitzgerald at the end of her career. It was her first book to be published in the USA.

Background
Fitzgerald had visited Italy frequently during the years 1949–83, including her belated honeymoon with Desmond (who had partly spent World War II in Italy), and a solo trip in 1976 as Desmond was dying, at his insistence.  The Fitzgeralds had published Italian fiction in World Review in the 1950s. Fitzgerald was familiar with the Communist Cesare Pavese.

Reception

Notes

References

Bibliography 
 
 

1982 British novels
Novels by Penelope Fitzgerald
Novels set in the 1950s
Novels set in Italy
William Collins, Sons books